Brent Stephen Smith (born January 10, 1978) is an American singer best known as the lead vocalist of the rock band Shinedown.

Early life 
Smith was born in Knoxville, Tennessee and is an only child.

Career 
Prior to fronting the rock band Shinedown, Smith had a high school band named Blind Thought and later was the lead singer in a band called Dreve, which Atlantic Records had signed. Atlantic Records forced Brent to either find another band or lose his record deal. He then went to Los Angeles, California to record with well-known producer Desmond Child. Shortly after returning home to Knoxville, Tennessee, Atlantic dropped the band but retained Smith. He put together Shinedown shortly after.  He was soon given a developmental contract by Atlantic Records. Smith moved to Jacksonville, Florida and began working on the project in 2001.

The first member he recruited was bassist Brad Stewart through local Jacksonville music producer Pete Thornton. Smith and Stewart began recording demos together in a small local studio, whose owner recommended they meet with her fiancé, guitarist Jasin Todd, who Smith brought in as the third member. The original lineup was rounded out by drummer Barry Kerch, who was the seventh drummer the band had auditioned for the spot. The four worked together on creating demos, and submitted their work-in-progress material to Atlantic, who approved of the material and green-lighted a full-length album. The band's debut album, Leave a Whisper was released May 27, 2003. The album was eventually certified platinum by the RIAA in the United States, indicating sales of over one million. Shinedown has since released six more studio albums: Us and Them (2005), The Sound of Madness (2008), Amaryllis (2012), Threat to Survival (2015), Attention Attention (2018), and Planet Zero (2022). In 2014, Smith and Zach Myers started an acoustic side project called Smith & Myers.

In early 2016, the band started recording their sixth album, as they revealed in an interview with Wes Styles of the 97.7 WQLZ radio station. The album, Attention Attention, was released on May 4, 2018. The first single off the album, titled "Devil", was released on March 7, 2018. On August 28th, 2022 Brent was presented with a key to Knox County at a concert in his hometown Knoxville, Tennessee by former wrestler and current Knox County Mayor Glenn Jacobs.

Personal life 
Smith has a son, Lyric Santana Smith, with his ex-fiancé, Ashley Smith Marshall. For years, Smith struggled with both drug and alcohol addiction and weight management. Following an intervention from his then-girlfriend, Smith eventually lost weight through exercise and a healthier diet, including quitting drinking. 

Smith says that his former girlfriend, Teresa, his son, and his fans inspired him to lose weight and become healthier.

Discography

Shinedown 

 Leave a Whisper (2003)
 Us and Them (2005)
 The Sound of Madness (2008)
 Amaryllis (2012)
 Threat to Survival (2015)
 Attention Attention (2018)
 Planet Zero (2022)

Smith & Myers 
 Volume I (2020)
 Volume II (2020)

Other 
 Halestorm
 "Here's to Us (Guest Version) (feat. Slash, Brent Smith, Wolfgang Van Halen, Myles Kennedy, James Michael, Tyler Connolly, David Draiman & Maria Brink)" (The Strange Case Of... (Reissue Version))
 In This Moment
 "Sexual Hallucination (feat. Brent Smith)" (Black Widow)
 Apocalyptica
 "Not Strong Enough (feat. Brent Smith)" (7th Symphony)
 Dreve (Brent's previous band)
 Saliva
 "Don't Question My Heart (feat. Brent Smith)" (WWE The Music, Vol. 8)
 "My Own Worst Enemy (feat. Brent Smith)" (Cinco Diablo)
 Theory of a Deadman "So Happy"
 One Less Reason "Seasons (feat. Brent Smith)" (Faces & Four Letter Words)
 Daughtry "There and Back Again"

References

External links 
 Official website
 Interview @ smnews.com

Living people
People from Knoxville, Tennessee
1978 births
Singers from Tennessee
American heavy metal singers
Shinedown members
21st-century American singers